Cryptochilini is a tribe of darkling beetles in the subfamily Pimeliinae of the family Tenebrionidae. There are about 11 genera in Cryptochilini, found in tropical Africa.

Genera
These genera belong to the tribe Cryptochilini
 Calognathus Guérin-Méneville, 1836
 Cerasoma Endrödy-Younga, 1989
 Cryptochile Latreille, 1828
 Cychrochile Koch, 1953
 Epipagus Haag-Rutenberg, 1872
 Homebius Endrödy-Younga, 1989
 Horatoma Solier, 1841
 Horatomella Penrith & Endrödy-Younga, 1994
 Orientochile Penrith & Endrödy-Younga, 1994
 Pachynotelus Solier, 1841
 Vansonium Koch, 1950

References

Further reading

 
 

Tenebrionoidea